Felix Pavlovich Korobov (born 24 May 1972) is a Russian conductor and cellist.

Biography
Korobov is a graduate of the Moscow Conservatory, cello (1996) and conducting (2002), he was the conductor of the State Academic Symphony Orchestra of Russia (Svetlanov Symphony Orchestra) and joined the Stanislavsky and Nemirovich-Danchenko Moscow Academic Music Theatre in 1999 and the Novaya Opera Theatre in 2003, becoming its principal conductor between 2004 and 2006. Korobov regularly conducts a repertoire of over thirty operas in the theatres of Moscow and as of 2011 he is chief conductor of the Stanislavsky and Nemirovich-Danchenko Moscow Music Theatre and often tours as a conductor and cellist. He has recorded about 20 CDs as of 2011.

He was awarded by the International Contest of Chamber Ensembles in Druskininkai, Lithuania (2002) and is an Honored Artist of Russia.

References

External links

Russian cellists
Living people
Moscow Conservatory alumni
Honored Artists of the Russian Federation
21st-century Russian conductors (music)
Russian male conductors (music)
21st-century Russian male musicians
1972 births
21st-century cellists